Nad Al Sheba is a locality in Dubai, United Arab Emirates (UAE). Situated south of the Dubai Creek, Nad Al Sheba is best known for its racecourse, the Nad Al Sheba Racecourse, which hosted the Dubai World Cup annually until 2009.

Organisation of locality 
Nad Al Sheba comprises four sub-communities:
 Nad Al Sheba 1
 Nad Al Sheba 2
 Nad Al Sheba 3
 Nad Al Sheba 4

The housing was built by Nakheel Properties and includes over 1,500 mediterranean and moroccan styled villas with four and five bedrooms.

Community facilities include a five kilometre cycling and running track, a community clubhouse, a restaurant, a sports center, a swimming pool and a gymnasium. A shopping mall us under construction.

The racecourse is located in Nad Al Sheba 1, while the stables that bred racehorses such as Dubai Millennium and Essence of Dubai are located in Nad Al Sheba 2.  The Nad Al Sheba palace of Hamdan bin Mohammed bin Rashid Al Maktoum is located in Nad Al Sheba 1.

Nad Al Sheba is bordered to the north by Al Markada, Bu Kadra and Ras Al Khor Industrial Areas, and to the west by Al Quoz.

Notable events 
On 3 September 2010, UPS Airlines Flight 6 crashed near the camp, killing both the crew members.

References 

Communities in Dubai